Tsanyawa is a Local Government Area in Kano State, Nigeria. Its headquarters are in the town of Tsanyawa.

It has an area of 492 km and a population of 157,680 at the 2006 census.

The postal code of the area is 703.

References

Local Government Areas in Kano State